The 1965 Norwegian Football Cup was the 60th edition of the Norwegian annual knockout football tournament. The Cup was won by Skeid after beating Frigg in the cup final. It took a two replays to decide the winner. This was Skeid's seventh Norwegian Cup title.

First round

|-
|colspan="3" style="background-color:#97DEFF"|Replay

|}

Second round

{{OneLegResult| Herd||1–2|Aalesund}}
{{OneLegResult|Hødd||2–3|Kristiansund}}

|-
|colspan="3" style="background-color:#97DEFF"|Replay

|}

Third round

|colspan="3" style="background-color:#97DEFF"|1 August 1965

|-
|colspan="3" style="background-color:#97DEFF"|Replay: 5 August 1965

|-
|colspan="3" style="background-color:#97DEFF"|Replay: Unknown date

|}

Fourth round

|colspan="3" style="background-color:#97DEFF"|22 August 1965

|}

Quarter-finals

|colspan="3" style="background-color:#97DEFF"|12 September 1965

|}

Semi-finals

|colspan="3" style="background-color:#97DEFF"|15 October 1965

|-
|colspan="3" style="background-color:#97DEFF"|17 October 1965

|-
|colspan="3" style="background-color:#97DEFF"|Replay: 20 October 1965

|}

Final

First match

Replay match

Second replay match

Squads
Skeid: Kjell Kaspersen, Ragnar Næss, Kjell Wangen, Jan "Jonas" Gulbrandsen, Frank Olafsen, Finn Thorsen, Erik Mejlo, Per Egil Bjørnsen, Terje Gulbrandsen,
Trygve Bornø, Kai Sjøberg, Pål Sæthrang, Terje Kristoffersen.

Frigg: Ebbe Gysler,  Anders Svela, Tore Børrehaug,  Jon Birch-Aune, Åge Solvang, Erik Hagen,  Ole Erik Hansen, Tore Fjeldstad, Per Pettersen, Arne Bergersen and Erik Schønfeldt.

References
http://www.rsssf.no

Norwegian Football Cup seasons
Norway
Football Cup